Keith Cotton (birth registered first ¼ 1942 ) is an English former professional rugby league footballer who played in the 1960s and 1970s, and coached in the 1970s.

Background
Keith Cotton's birth was registered in Pontefract, West Riding of Yorkshire, England.

Playing career
Cotton made his début for Featherstone Rovers on Saturday 4 November 1961, and he played his last match for Featherstone Rovers during the  1972–73 season.

Challenge Cup Final appearances
Cotton played right-, i.e. number 3, in Featherstone Rovers' 17-12 victory over Barrow in the 1966–67 Challenge Cup Final during the 1966–67 season at Wembley Stadium, London on Saturday 13 May 1967, in front of a crowd of 76,290.

County Cup Final appearances
Cotton played right-, i.e. number 3, in Featherstone Rovers' 7-23 defeat by Leeds in the 1970–71 Yorkshire County Cup Final during the 1970–71 season at Headingley Rugby Stadium, Leeds on Saturday 21 November 1970.

Testimonial match
Cotton's benefit season at Featherstone Rovers took place during the 1973–74 season.

Coaching career

Championship appearances
Cotton was the coach in Featherstone Rovers' victory in Championship during the 1976–77 season.

County Cup Final appearances
Cotton was the coach in Featherstone Rovers' 12-16 defeat by Leeds in the 1976–77 Yorkshire County Cup Final during the 1976–77 season at Headingley Rugby Stadium, Leeds on Saturday 16 October 1976, and was the coach in the 7-17 defeat by Castleford in the 1977–78 Yorkshire County Cup Final during the 1977–78 season at Headingley Rugby Stadium, Leeds on Saturday 15 October 1977.

References

External links
Search for "Cotton" at rugbyleagueproject.org
A FEATHERSTONE ROVERS BLOG: Keith Cotton August 1976 to …

1942 births
Living people
English rugby league coaches
English rugby league players
Featherstone Rovers coaches
Featherstone Rovers players
Rugby league centres
Rugby league players from Pontefract